Penetration rate may refer to:

Market penetration, in marketing, a parameter to show the rate of circulation of a product in its market
Rate of penetration, or drill rate, the speed at which a drill bit breaks the rock under it to deepen the borehole
Mobile phone penetration rate is often used to mean the number of active mobile phone users per 100 people within a specific population